Antti Ollila (born 25 December 1994) is a Finnish freestyle skier. He was born in Rovaniemen maalaiskunta. He competed at the 2014 Winter Olympics in Sochi, in slopestyle.

References 

1994 births
Living people
People from Rovaniemi
Freestyle skiers at the 2014 Winter Olympics
Finnish male freestyle skiers
Olympic freestyle skiers of Finland
Sportspeople from Lapland (Finland)